Garth Rowswell  is a Canadian politician who was elected in the 2019 Alberta general election to represent the electoral district of Vermilion-Lloydminster-Wainwright in the 30th Alberta Legislature. He is a member of the United Conservative Party. He is a member of the United Conservative Party.

Background 
Prior to his election as a member of the Legislative Assembly of Alberta Mr. Rowswell worked with the financial services firm Edward Jones Investments as a financial advisor. In addition to this financial experience, Mr. Rowswell has a background in the agricultural industry. After moving to the Vermillion area in 1990, Mr. Rowswell acquired the farm supply company Valley Fertilizers and worked in various management capacities for other agricultural businesses. Eventually Rowswell became the President of the Canadian Association of Agri-Retailers. Mr. Rowswell graduated from the University of Alberta with a Bachelor of Science in agriculture.

Mr. Rowswell’s volunteer experience includes serving as the president of the Vermillion Vipers Swim Club, the Vermillion Curling Club and as a member of the Vermillion and Lloydminster chambers of commerce. Rowswell is a Rotarian and served as the president of the Rotary Club of Lloydminster.

Mr. Rowswell is married and the father of two daughters.

Political Career 
Mr. Rowswell has been an advocate of business and industry in his elected office. Reducing red tape and regulation was a key element of Rowswell’s plan prior to his election. Rowswell spoke to the increase in tax revenues accrued by the Government of Alberta upon the reduction in the corporate tax rate. In addition, Mr. Rowswell promoted the need to support businesses in the province during the Covid-19 Pandemic.

Garth Rowswell was one of sixteen United Conservative Party MLAs expressing disagreement with the government's approach to the Covid-19 Pandemic. Citing concerns by his constituents, Mr. Rowswell added his own signature to the existing fifteen which he announced in a Facebook post.

During his time as an elected member Garth Rowswell has served as the Chair of the Standing Committee on the Alberta Heritage Trust Fund twice as well as the Alberta First Cabinet Policy Committee. In addition to this service, he has been a member of the Standing Committee on Alberta’s Economic Future, the Select Special Committee on Real Property Rights, the Standing Committee on Public accounts and the Select Special Public Health Act Review Committee among others.

Electoral History

References

External Links 
Facebook post of Garth Rowswell on why he signed the letter condemning the governments response to the Covid-19 Pandemic.

Businesspeople from Alberta
People from Lloydminster
United Conservative Party MLAs
Living people
21st-century Canadian politicians
Year of birth missing (living people)